The 16th People's Choice Awards, honoring the best in popular culture for 1989, were held on March 11, 1990, at Universal Studios Hollywood, in Universal City, California. They were hosted by various hosts including Barbara Mandrell and Valerie Harper. It was broadcast on CBS.

Awards
Winners are listed first, in bold.

External links
1990 People's Choice.com

People's Choice Awards
1990 awards in the United States
1990 in California
March 1990 events in the United States